Les Herbiers Vendée Football is a French football club based in Les Herbiers, Vendée. It was founded in 1919. They play at the Stade Massabielle, which has a capacity of 5,000 people. The colours of the club are red and black.

From the 2015–16 season, the club has played in the Championnat National, the highest level the club has ever reached.

History
In 1919, Father Rousseau founded the club "Alouette Sportive" which became "Les Herbiers Sports" in 1923. In 1941, the club "Coqs du Bocage" was born in Petit-Bourg des Herbiers.

The merger of the two clubs was determined in a general meeting on 7 March 1947. According to FFF regulations, it became effective on 1 July 1947. The club was renamed the "Entente Sportive Herbretaise" in 1949.

Les Herbiers played regional football until 1978, when they were invited to the newly created French fourth division, but they were relegated to the regional leagues in 1979. The club technically joined the fourth tier of French soccer in 1975.

The red-blacks fell as far as the seventh division before working their way back into the national football structure in 2007, followed by promotion to the third division in 2015. Les Herbiers avoided relegation in their first two seasons in the third division.

In 2002, the Entente Sportive Herbretaise changed its name to "The Herbiers Football (HVF). In 2006, the club again changed its name to "The Vendee Herbiers Football (VHF).

On 17 April 2018, Les Herbiers defeated fellow third-division side Chambly to reach the final of the Coupe de France. Les Herbiers upset second-division Lens in the quarterfinals and Auxerre in the round of 16 en route to the final, making their run to the final without facing a first-division team. Les Herbiers lost the final 2–0 to Paris Saint-Germain on 8 May 2018.	
	
On 11 May 2018, Les Herbiers were beaten 4–1 at Béziers to drop to the Championnat National 2 – the 4th tier of French football – and the same level as Paris Saint-Germain's reserve team at the time. In May 2022, Laurent David replaced Stéphane Masala as head coach. Masala had been the manager since 2018, when he brought the side to the final of the Coupe de France.

Current squad

Reserve teams
Les Herbiers has a reserve team that plays in Régional 1 Pays de la Loire, a third team in Régional 3, a fourth team in District 2 Vendée and a fifth team in District 4 Vendée.

Honours
 Coupe de France runners-up: 2017–18
 Atlantique DH championship: 1999
 Championnat de France amateur 2 Group G: 2006

References

External links
  Official website

Association football clubs established in 1919
1919 establishments in France
Sport in Vendée
Football clubs in Pays de la Loire